The Teacher Development Trust is a UK charity which works to raise awareness of the importance of professional development for teachers and other education professionals.

Founded by teachers in London in March 2012, the Trust promotes access to evidence-based, high quality training through its nationwide programmes.

Mission 

Teacher Development Trust mission statement:

"The Teacher Development Trust is an independent charity, founded by teachers, dedicated to improving the educational outcomes of children by ensuring they experience the most effective learning. We are raising awareness of the importance of professional development and building tools to help teachers to transform their practice and achieve success for all their pupils.

"The Trust believes that demand for professional learning should be driven by the aspiration teachers have for the children they teach and the passion they bring to their work.

"We are determined to bring about radical improvement in the quality of the ongoing training that teachers receive based on the evidence of what creates effective learning."

The Trust also states that it aims to promote types and characteristics of teacher professional development proved successful by "strong international research".

Chief executive David Weston has said:

"Our ultimate vision is that in five years, England stands out above other nations in the developed world in the value and priority it gives to CPD. We can do this if we grow what we have achieved so far, rather than starting from scratch."

Origins 

In April 2012 the British government closed the Training and Development Agency for Schools (TDA), the national body formerly responsible for teachers’ training and professional development.

In response to the planned closure, Teacher Development Trust was founded by teachers as a new agency aiming to support teachers’ professional learning.

Programmes 

Teacher Development Trust currently runs two nationwide programmes alongside its ad hoc consultancy services.

TDT Advisor 

TDT Advisor is the Trust's professional development database. It provides listings and ratings for professional development training courses, consultancy, and other services.

TDT Advisor was launched in 2012 and is free of charge to providers and users.

Users are able to review courses and resources they have used. This has been compared to the "TripAdvisor" style of rating, referring to the popular site's effective use of user generated content.

In January 2013, a partnership was set up between Teacher Development Trust, Education Endowment Foundation and Sutton Trust. As part of this partnership, GoodCPDGuide professional development listings are aligned with the topics listed in the EEF-Sutton Trust Teaching and Learning Toolkit. This Toolkit summarises research to provide "guidance to teachers and schools on how to use their resources to improve the attainment of disadvantaged pupils."

All TDT Advisor users must agree to the site's Code of Practice. Teacher Development Trust, EEF and Sutton Trust, undertake joint random quality sampling.

Teacher Development Trust Network 

In July 2013, Teacher Development Trust launched the Network (formerly known as the National Teacher Enquiry Network (NTEN)).

TDT Network is an opt-in UK school network whose member organisations will share and develop evidence-based professional development practice.

Services offered to members of the network include:
 A peer-audit scheme, whereby members are trained to review provisions for professional development in other member organisations.
 Support to implement NTEN Lesson Study, a process of practitioner-led enquiry.
 Networking opportunities and events
 Advice on optimising professional development in schools

TDT Lesson Study is based on the theory and practice of Lesson Study, a teaching improvement process originating from Japan. In Lesson Study, teachers work in a small group to discuss their learning goals, create a "research lesson", then observe this lesson to revise and report on results. Groups finish by writing and disseminating their findings to assist colleagues and other teachers.

Lesson Study has been credited as enabling "better understanding of student thinking in order to develop lessons that advance student learning".  Pilot Lesson Study schemes in England in 2003-2005 have also shown that the process allows for "increased risk-taking […] through sharing the ownership of the lesson and its outcomes – which contrasts sharply with much of the effects of inspection and performance management oriented observation which can lead teachers to play safe".

Other work 

Teacher Development Trust provides free advice for teachers and schools and offers support and consultancy for training providers.

The Trust runs a frequent blog on professional development and contributes each month to SecEd, a weekly magazine for secondary education.

The Trust was represented at the Education Innovation conference in Manchester in March 2013  and at the Research ED Conference 2013 where chief executive David Weston spoke on Bridging the Chasm Between Practitioners and Researchers.

David Weston is also a regular contributor to the Guardian newspaper’s Teacher network.

Response 

The Department for Education, the Teaching Agency and the National College for School Leadership have all expressed support for the Teacher Development Trust.

In a speech to teachers and headteachers at the National College for Teaching and Leadership on 25 April 2013, Secretary of State for Education Michael Gove said of the Trust’s chief executive David Weston:

"I’m […] indebted to David Weston, Chief Executive of the Teacher Development Trust - who is a principled and non-partisan voice for reform"

In its September 2013 report on the causes of educational failure, Requires Improvement, the Centre for Social Justice used Teacher Development Trust research and reports to demonstrate the importance of professional standards in teacher development.

The Trust has also gained support from major education organisations Iris Connect for its "rigid focus upon the quality of CPD provision" and from Optimus Education, who described the Trust as a "grass-roots alternative in development, designed to support members of the profession at all stages of their careers."

In May 2013, chief executive David Weston was appointed to the judging panel for the EducationInvestor awards.

Management 

The Trust's chief executive is David Weston, a former maths and physics teacher and Chair of the Department for Education's Teachers' Professional Development Expert Group. The Trust's work is supported by former and current teaching professionals and education experts. Public Relations and communications for the Trust are run by Consilium Communications.

Trustees 

The Trust's board of trustees is made up of:

 John Holman (Chair), President, Royal Society of Chemistry, Emeritus Professor of Chemistry at the University of York and Senior Adviser in Education at the Wellcome Trust and the Gatsby Foundation, Chair of the Salters Institute, Former Headteacher. Former Headteacher.
 Mark McCourt was the founding Chairman of the Teacher Development Trust.  He is Chief Executive of La Salle Education and formerly senior director at  Tribal, director at NCETM, a school leader, inspector and AST.
 Russell Hobby, General Secretary of the National Association of Head Teachers
 Anna Pedroza, an independent communications and marketing consultant who works with  TeachersMedia, Edcomshttp://www.edcoms.com/, O2 Learn and Iris Connect. Formerly Director of Marketing and Communications at Teachers TV.
 Martin Post, Headmaster of  Watford Grammar School for Boys and National Leader of Education
 Veena Naidoo
 David Laws
 Sam Freedman

Advisory board 
The Trust's advisory board is made up of:
 Professor Robert Coe, Professor in the School of Education and Director of the Centre for Evaluation and Monitoring (CEM) at Durham University
 Philippa Cordingley, Chief Executive, Centre for the Use of Research and Evidence in Education (CUREE)
 Professor Pete Dudley, Professor of Education, University of Leicester, formerly Director of the Primary National Strategy
 Liz Francis, Deputy Director, Performance Unit, Department for Education. Formerly director of workforce strategy, standards and qualifications at TDA
 Dr Jonathan Sharples, Manager of Partnerships at the Institute for Effective Education
 Laura McInerney

External links
 Teacher Development Trusts' website

References 

2012 establishments in the United Kingdom
Education in the London Borough of Islington
Organisations based in the London Borough of Islington
Teacher training colleges in the United Kingdom
Teacher training programs